Elophila aristodora is a moth in the family Crambidae. It was described by Turner in 1908. It is found on Australia, where it has been recorded from Queensland.

References

Acentropinae
Moths described in 1908
Moths of Australia